Empress Mao ( 223 – 22 September 237), personal name unknown, formally known as Empress Mingdao, was an empress of the state of Cao Wei during the Three Kingdoms period of China. She was married to Cao Rui, the second emperor of Wei.

History 
Lady Mao hailed from a poor family from Henei; her father Mao Jia was a carpenter in the Department of Public Works. She became a concubine of Cao Rui during the reign of his father, Cao Pi when Cao Rui was Prince of Pingyuan and Lady Yu, also from Henei, was the chief wife. However Cao Rui was noted to show great favour to Mao, often sharing a carriage with her. 

When Cao Rui became emperor in 226 following his father's death, Mao was made a Noble Lady and it wasn't till late 227 that the new Emperor picked who would be Empress, with grain given out to those who had lost their spouse, the childless, orphans and the helpless. Mao was made Empress, to the annoyance of Lady Yu who told Rui's grandmother, the Empress Dowager Bian, that the Cao clan's failure to pick an Empress from a proper background would bring down the state. Lady Yu was promptly sent away. Soon after, Cao Rui ennobled her father Jia and gave her brother Mao Zeng (毛曾) a court position, and would continue to show the family great favour. However when Cao Rui ordered officials to go to Mao Jia's house for banquets and events, Mao Jia's foolish behaviour including calling himself "Lordly Person" made him a mockery at court.

Over time, Consort Guo became Cao Rui's favoured concubine and Empress Mao began losing favour. Things came to a head in 237 when Cao Rui hosted a party in the Rear Palace for the senior concubines with music and merriment. Consort Guo requested that Empress Mao be invited to join as well, but Cao Rui refused and further ordered that no news about the feast be given to Empress Mao. However, Empress Mao knew of the party and pointedly asked the next day, "Was yesterday’s party in the northern garden pleasant?". Cao Rui believed someone had leaked the news to Empress Mao; the usually tolerant Emperor killed over ten of his attendants then ordered Empress Mao to commit suicide on 22 September 237. She was buried on 25 October 237 with honours befitting an empress, and her family remained honoured.

In Romance of the Three Kingdoms 
Empress Mingdao is introduced in chapter 105 as the novel sets out Cao Rui's opulence and lack of restraint. Her background is ignored; initially beloved by Cao Rui, she becomes empress as soon as he becomes emperor. Neglected when he became more interested in Consort Guo, when Guo urges Cao Rui to invite the empress, he replied that he would eat or drink nothing if Mao was at the garden feast. With Cao Rui then missing for a month, Empress Mao and her ladies come to the Blue Flower Pavilion to entertain themselves when they hear music in the Fragrant Forest Park. Mao makes enquiries and is saddened to have heard what her husband had been up to. The next day, she spots Cao Rui from her carriage and enquired about the party. Scared by Cao Rui's violent reaction, she returns to her palace. Cao Rui then orders her death and immediately makes Guo empress; the court officials are too frightened to protest.

The next chapter, after the destruction of Gongsun Yuan, Cao Rui is awoken during the middle of the night by a cold wind and in the darkness, he sees Empress Mao and some attendants. They come to his bed and demand his life; the frightened emperor then becomes mortally ill.

See also
 Cao Wei family trees#Cao Rui
 Lists of people of the Three Kingdoms

Notes

References

 Chen, Shou (3rd century). Records of the Three Kingdoms (Sanguozhi).
 Pei, Songzhi (5th century). Annotations to Records of the Three Kingdoms (Sanguozhi zhu).
 Robert Joe Cutter and William Gordon Crowell. Empresses and Consorts: Selections from Chen Shou's Records of the Three States with Pei Songzhi's Commentary. Honolulu: University of Hawai'i Press, 1999.

237 deaths
Cao Wei empresses
Forced suicides of Chinese people
Suicides in Cao Wei
Executed Cao Wei people
People executed by Cao Wei
Executed people from Henan
Year of birth unknown
3rd-century executions